In Binbinga mythology, Ulanji is a snake-ancestor of the Binbinga.  He bit the heads off some flying foxes and took out two of their ribs and their heart. Ulanji emerged from the ground at a place called Markumundana. He walked along to a large hill, Windilumba, where he made a spring, and also a mountain close by. He crossed what is now known as the Limmen Creek, and made a range of hills and a valley, with a large number of water-holes and plenty of lilies in them. He left behind numbers of Ulanji spirits, which emanated from his body, wherever he performed ceremonies. After travelling over a great extent of country, and making many mungai (totem animal) spots, he finally went into the ground at a water-hole called Uminiwura.

The Binbinga believe that both men and women can see the spirit children at the mungai spots.

Sources

References

Australian Aboriginal mythology
Legendary serpents